Sidney Shufelt was a member of the Wisconsin State Assembly.

Biography
Shufelt was born on April 19, 1824, in Franklin County, Vermont. He moved to Poygan, Wisconsin in 1854. He married Mary Walker on January 12, 1848. They had two children before her death in 1851. Shufelt later married Mary Condon on February 1, 1853. He died in 1910 and was buried in Poygan.

Career
During the American Civil War, Shufelt served with the 7th Wisconsin Volunteer Infantry Regiment. He was a member of the Assembly from 1876 to 1877. Positions Shufelt held in Poygan include Town Chairman. He was a Republican.

References

People from Franklin County, Vermont
People from Winnebago County, Wisconsin
Republican Party members of the Wisconsin State Assembly
Mayors of places in Wisconsin
People of Wisconsin in the American Civil War
Union Army soldiers
1824 births
1910 deaths
Burials in Wisconsin
19th-century American politicians